The F Defensora (F-41) is a Niterói-class frigate of the Brazilian Navy. The Defensora was the second ship of her class ordered by the Brazilian Navy, on 20 September 1970. The Niterói was launched on 14 December 1972, and was commissioned on 3 March 1977.

History
F Defensora was modernized in June 2000, receiving improvements particularly in the sensor and armament systems, returning to active service in August 2003. Afterwards the vessel is proudly nicknamed “The Goddess” for its crew.

The Navy Arsenal of Rio de Janeiro carried out, on July 13, the shipment of the last two propulsion engines in the Defensora, submitted to the W6 review, anticipating the goal by 15 days of the predicted. The event is an important milestone in the General Maintenance Period (PMG) of the ship, which, in 2017, was selected as one of the priority projects of the Navy.

Gallery

External links 

 In depth history of Defensora

References

Niteroi-class frigates
1975 ships
Ships built in Southampton
Frigates of the Cold War